Pitch Perfect 3 is a 2017 American musical comedy film directed by Trish Sie and written by Kay Cannon and Mike White. A sequel to Pitch Perfect 2 (2015) and the third and final installment in the Pitch Perfect franchise, the film features Anna Kendrick, Rebel Wilson, Hailee Steinfeld, Brittany Snow, Anna Camp, Hana Mae Lee, Ester Dean, Chrissie Fit, Alexis Knapp, Kelly Jakle, Shelley Regner, John Michael Higgins, and Elizabeth Banks all reprising their roles from previous installments, and they are joined by John Lithgow, DJ Khaled, Ruby Rose, Matt Lanter, and Guy Burnet. The film follows the Bellas, now graduated from college, reuniting for one final performance together during an overseas USO tour.

Principal photography on the film began in January 2017 in Atlanta, Georgia, and ended in April 2017. The film was released in the United States on December 22, 2017, received negative reviews from critics (unlike its predecessors) and grossed $185 million worldwide against its $45 million budget. It became the second-highest grossing musical comedy film of all time, behind its predecessor.

Plot

Two years after their final competition, the Bellas have graduated from Barden University, but they all hate their jobs. And to make matters worse, Beca and Jesse's relationship ended in between the second and third film, and Amy and Bumper's relationship didn't last too long either. Beca, Amy, Chloe, Aubrey, Lilly, Stacie, Cynthia Rose, Florencia, Jessica, and Ashley are thrilled when Emily, now a senior and leader of the current Barden Bellas, invites them to an event. Arriving at the reunion, they learn that Emily simply invited them to see the new Bellas, not sing. The Bellas later gather at a bar, disappointed, and express how much they miss each other. Aubrey convinces them to join a USO tour, hoping her father sees.

Emily fills in for Stacie, who is eight months pregnant. The Bellas land at a base in Rota, Spain, greeted by liaisons soldiers Chicago and Zeke. They also meet the other three bands, including the mean-spirited female quartet Evermoist. The others use musical instruments, making the Bellas feel off. Chloe begins to fall for Chicago. Fat Amy learns that Fergus, her estranged father (also a ruthless international crime lord), has found her at their hotel. The Bellas are invited to a party at DJ Khaled's suite, while Amy is invited to a poker tournament. The tournament was a ruse by Fergus, who begs to be in Amy's life, which she agrees to after believing he has changed.

Beca develops a friendship with DJ Khaled's music producer Theo, who is impressed when she easily produces a mix of her own singing on Khaled's editing equipment. Moments later, the party is thrown into chaos when Aubrey accidentally starts a fire. While the Bellas are wallowing in disgrace, Stacie calls with news that her daughter, Bella, has been born, invigorating them. Back on the tour, the Bellas perform to adoring crowds. Fergus and Amy are gradually making up, until he accidentally reveals that he is only trying to acquire her US$180 million offshore account created by Amy's mother, causing Amy to disown her father. Meanwhile, DJ Khaled asks Beca to open for him without the other Bellas. Beca declines the offer and returns to her room, and doesn't tell the group she was asked.

The Bellas (without Beca and Amy) are abducted and taken aboard Fergus' yacht, as an attempt to manipulate Amy. When she and Beca learn of the kidnapping, they sneak onboard. Beca distracts Fergus by leading the Bellas in a performance of "Toxic", while Amy sets up and detonates a bomb. The Bellas escape the yacht, and Fergus is later arrested. After the Bellas are rescued by the military, Amy reveals DJ Khaled's proposition to Beca to the others. They encourage her to take the chance, agreeing that it is time to move on with their lives. They know they will stay connected to each other as a family. At the USO's final performance, Beca opens for DJ Khaled, then brings the Bellas onstage to sing their final performance – "Freedom! '90".

Gail and John, the public announcers when the Bellas originally competed, have filmed a Bella documentary, only to be appalled when John realizes they didn't record the Bellas' final performance. Now the Bellas' lives are improving: Amy uses her new bankroll for tributes to singers named Amy; Aubrey works as a birthing coach; Flo's juice cart becomes an international brand; Chloe gets into vet school; Cynthia-Rose enlists in the USAF flight school; Emily returns to Barden and to her songwriting; Lilly reveals that she was quiet because she was possessed by Satan, the bomb snapped her out of it, and her real name is Esther, and starts a relationship with DJ Dragon Nutz; Aubrey reconnects with her father; Chloe and Chicago become an item; Beca is now Theo's boss.

Cast
 Anna Kendrick as Beca Mitchell, an alumna and the former leader of the Barden Bellas, who works as a producer but quits due to creative differences, before joining the tour. She has been sharing an apartment in New York City with her best friends Chloe and Fat Amy for the last two years.
 Rebel Wilson as Patricia "Fat Amy" Hobart, a super confident comedic alumna of The Barden Bellas, from Australia. She held a one-woman show, "Fat Amy Winehouse", before joining the tour.
 Hailee Steinfeld as Emily Junk, a senior student at Barden University and the current leader of the new Barden Bellas, who joins her former classmates for the tour.
 Brittany Snow as Chloe Beale, a Barden Bellas alumna and former co-leader, who longs for glory days with the Bellas. She applied to attend a vet school before joining the tour.
 Anna Camp as Aubrey Posen, a Barden Bellas alumna and former leader, before Beca, who worked at the Lodge of Fallen Leaves. Through her father, the Bellas were invited to the USO tour.
 John Lithgow as Fergus Hobart, Fat Amy's estranged criminal father
 DJ Khaled as himself
 Hana Mae Lee as Lilly Onakuramara/Esther, a Barden Bellas alumna known for her quiet speaking voice and odd remarks. She worked as a tailor before joining the tour.
 Ester Dean as Cynthia Rose Adams, a tough tomboy Barden Bellas alumna, who failed the Flight School simulation before joining the tour.
 Chrissie Fit as Florencia "Flo" Fuentes, a Barden Bellas alumna, from Guatemala. She worked at a juice truck before joining the tour.
 Ruby Rose as Calamity, lead singer of the band Evermoist
 Alexis Knapp as Stacie Conrad, a Barden Bellas alumna, known for being overly sexual. She works as a pilates instructor and despite wanting to, could not join the tour due to her pregnancy.
 Kelley Jakle as Jessica Smith, a Barden Bellas alumna.
 Shelley Regner as Ashley Jones, a Barden Bellas alumna.
 Matt Lanter as Chicago, a U.S. soldier guiding the Bellas during the tour, and Chloe's love interest.
 Guy Burnet as Theo, DJ Khaled's music producer, who takes a liking to Beca
 Andy Allo as Serenity, a member of Evermoist
 Hannah Fairlight as Veracity, a member of Evermoist
 Venzella Joy Williams as Charity, drummer for Evermoist
 John Michael Higgins as John Smith, an a cappella commentator making an insulting documentary about The Bellas
 Elizabeth Banks as Gail Abernathy-McKadden-Feinberger, the other a cappella commentator making an insulting documentary about The Bellas

Additionally, Trinidad James appears as Young Sparrow, D.J. Looney appears as DJ Dragon Nutz, Whiskey Shivers appears as the group Saddle Up, Troy Ian Hall appears as Zeke, Moisés Arias appears as Pimp-Lo, Jessica Chaffin appears as Evan, and Michael Rose appears as Aubrey's Father.

Production 
On April 11, 2015, a month before the release of the second film, it was announced that Rebel Wilson would return for a third film, although she stated that she did not know if Anna Kendrick or other cast members would also reprise their roles. She added that she would be "up for a Fat Amy spin-off". Director and producer of the second film Elizabeth Banks acknowledged the possibility of a third film during promotion of Pitch Perfect 2, saying, "it would be disingenuous to say that no one’s talking about a Pitch Perfect 3; the possibility of it."

On June 10, 2015, a third film was officially confirmed, and Kay Cannon was set to return to write the script. On June 15, 2015, it was announced that Kendrick and Wilson would both reprise their roles, and on July 28, 2015, Brittany Snow signed on to return as well. Paul Brooks again produced for Gold Circle Films, along with Banks and Max Handelman for Brownstone Productions. On October 27, 2015, Banks was officially announced to return as director for the film, though she exited in that capacity on June 3, 2016. On September 1, 2016, Trish Sie was confirmed to direct the film. On December 13, 2016, it was reported that Ruby Rose was in talks to join the cast, while Anna Camp signed on to return for the sequel. Cannon wrote the script with later drafts by Mike White and Dana Fox; White would eventually receive screenwriting credits alongside Cannon. On January 5, 2017, a table read occurred, with Ester Dean, Hana Mae Lee, Chrissie Fit, Kelley Jakle, and Shelley Regner also being confirmed to reprise their roles, and singer Andy Allo joining as Charity, a rival in a group opposing the Bellas. While it was revealed by vocal director Deke Sharon that Alexis Knapp would return; on February 6, she posted a photo on Instagram, confirming her return, and was on set the following day, filming a short cameo performance.

Filming
Principal photography on the film began on January 5, 2017, and took place in Atlanta, Georgia, Cádiz, Spain and Nice, France, wrapping on April 3, 2017.

The closing credits included outtakes, rehearsals and behind the scenes footage of the actresses spending time together during production of all three films in the series.

Release
Pitch Perfect 3 was initially scheduled for release on July 21, and then August 4, 2017. It had its world premiere in Sydney, Australia, on November 30, 2017, and was released in the United States on December 22, 2017.

Reception

Box office
Pitch Perfect 3 grossed $104.9 million in the United States and Canada and $80.5 million in other territories, for a worldwide total of $185.4 million, against a production budget of $45 million.

In the United States and Canada, Pitch Perfect 3 was released alongside the openings of Downsizing and Father Figures, as well as the wide expansions of The Shape of Water and Darkest Hour, and was projected to gross $27–35 million from 3,447 theaters in its opening weekend. The film took in $2.1 million from Thursday night previews, about half of the $4.6 million earned by its predecessor. Over the three-day weekend, which included Christmas Eve, it grossed $19.9 million (down nearly 70% from the second film's $69.2 million debut), finishing third at the box office, behind Star Wars: The Last Jedi and Jumanji: Welcome to the Jungle. It grossed an additional $6.5 million on Christmas Day, for a four-day total of $26.4 million. It dropped 15% the following weekend, grossing $16.8 million, and a total of $21.7 million over the four-day New Year's frame.

Critical response
On Rotten Tomatoes, the film has an approval rating of 28% based on 150 reviews and an average rating of 4.7/10. The website's critical consensus reads, "Pitch Perfect 3 strains to recapture the magic that helped the original spawn a franchise, but ends up sending this increasingly unnecessary trilogy out on a low note." On Metacritic, the film has a weighted average score of 40 out of 100 based on 35 critics, indicating "mixed or average reviews". Audiences polled by CinemaScore gave the film an average grade of "A−" on an A+ to F scale, the same score earned by its predecessor.

Owen Gleiberman of Variety praised the cast and said, "The new film doesn't add anything revolutionary to the Pitch Perfect formula. It still sounds like we're in middle-period Glee written by someone who finds Ryan Murphy too solemn. But as directed by Trish Sie, the movie is bubbly, it's fast, it's hella synthetic-clever, and it's an avid showcase for the personalities of its stars."

Frank Scheck for The Hollywood Reporter wrote "... what started out as a charmingly offbeat comic premise has inevitably degenerated into the sort of crass commercialism that probably would make the Bellas themselves turn up their noses."

Accolades
Pitch Perfect 3 won Choice Comedy Movie Actress for Anna Kendrick at the August 12, 2018 Teen Choice Awards and nominations for Hailee Steinfeld and Rebel Wilson also for Choice Comedy Movie Actress as well as the movie being nominated for Choice Comedy Movie.

Music 

The official soundtrack was released on December 15, 2017.

Possible sequel 
When asked about a sequel to Pitch Perfect 3, director Trish Sie said in December 2017, "Of course that's above my pay grade and I have no idea and am not the one making the decisions but as far as I am concerned, I would see these movies on and on and on until they start sucking. I think whether it's these women in the next stage of life or it's a new group of women going through these things, I think there are endless ways to chart the course of the girls' lives and a woman's life."

References

External links

 
 

2017 films
2010s buddy comedy films
2010s musical comedy films
American buddy comedy films
American female buddy films
American musical comedy films
American sequel films
2010s English-language films
Films about competitions
Films about music and musicians
Films set in New York City
Films set in Paris
Films set in Spain
Films produced by Elizabeth Banks
Films scored by Christopher Lennertz
Films with screenplays by Mike White
Brownstone Productions films
Gold Circle Films films
Universal Pictures films
Pitch Perfect (films)
2017 comedy films
Films directed by Trish Sie
2010s female buddy films
Jukebox musical films
2010s American films